The 2019 Caribbean Club Shield was the second edition of the Caribbean Club Shield (also known as the CFU Club Shield), the second-tier annual international club football competition in the Caribbean region, held amongst clubs whose football associations are affiliated with the Caribbean Football Union (CFU), a sub-confederation of CONCACAF. The tournament was played in Curaçao between 5–15 April 2019.

The winners of the 2019 CONCACAF Caribbean Club Shield, as long as they fulfill the CONCACAF Regional Club Licensing criteria, would play against the fourth place team of the 2019 CONCACAF Caribbean Club Championship in a playoff match to determine the final Caribbean spot to the 2019 CONCACAF League.

Robinhood defeated title holders Club Franciscain in the final to win their first CONCACAF Caribbean Club Shield, and later defeated Real Hope in a playoff to qualify for the CONCACAF League.

Teams

Among the 31 CFU member associations, 27 of them were classified as non-professional leagues and each may enter one team in the CONCACAF Caribbean Club Shield. A total of 13 teams (from 13 associations) entered the 2019 CONCACAF Caribbean Club Shield.

Associations which did not enter a team

Venues
The matches were played at the Ergilio Hato Stadium and Stadion dr. Antoine Maduro in Willemstad.

Match officials

Referees
 Jaime Herrera (El Salvador)
 William Anderson (Puerto Rico)
 Ricangel de Leca (Aruba)
 Sherwin Johnson (Guyana)
 Charvis Delsol (Dominica)
 Moeth Gaymes (Saint Vincent and the Grenadines) 
 Damien Rosa (Martinique)
 Steven Madrigal (Costa Rica)
 Benbito Celima (Haiti)  
 Patrick Senecharles (Haiti)
 Gregory Prevot (French Guiana)
 Juniel Adelina (Curaçao) 

Assistant Referees
 Jermaine  Yee Sing (Jamaica) 
 Wasnah Barnarde (Antigua and Barbuda) 
 Jairo Morales (Puerto Rico) 
 José Mangandi (El Salvador) 
 Kleon Lindey (Guyana) 
 Jade Garcia Salamatin (Aruba)
 Clide Cadette (Dominica) 
 Wilson Tilus (Haiti) 
 Yordanis Gomez (Cuba) 
 Clenton Daniel (Grenada) 
 Rayner Goedgedrag (Curaçao)  
 Alegandro Wilson (Curaçao)

Group stage
The draw for the group stage was held on 11 January 2019, 11:00 EST (UTC−5), at the CONCACAF Headquarters in Miami, United States. The 13 teams were drawn into four groups: one group of four teams and three groups of three teams. The team from the host association Curaçao, Jong Holland, were allocated to position A1, while the remaining 12 teams were drawn into the other group positions without any seeding.

The winners and runners-up of each group advance to the quarter-finals. The third-placed teams play in the consolation matches.

All times local, AST (UTC−4).

Group A

Group B

Group C

Group D

Knockout stage

Qualified teams

Bracket

Consolation matches

Quarter-finals

Semi-finals

Final
Winners advanced to CONCACAF League playoff against 2019 CONCACAF Caribbean Club Championship fourth-placed team for a place in 2019 CONCACAF League preliminary round.

Top goalscorers

See also
2019 Caribbean Club Championship
2019 CONCACAF League
2020 CONCACAF Champions League

References

External links
Caribbean Club Shield, CONCACAF.com
Concacaf Caribbean Club Shield Curaçao Facebook page

2019
2
2019 CONCACAF League
April 2019 sports events in North America
International association football competitions hosted by Curaçao